Alampur may refer to the following :

Places in India 
 Alampur, Agra, a village in Agra district, Uttar Pradesh
 Alampur, Bijnor, a village in Bijnor district, Uttar Pradesh
 Alampur, Jalandhar, village in the Indian Punjab
 Alampur, Madhya Pradesh, town in Madhya Pradesh
 Alampur, Jogulamba Gadwal district, village in Telangana
 Alampur Museum, a museum located in Alampur, Mahbubnagar
 Alampur Navabrahma Temples, located in Alampur, Mahbubnagar

 Alampur (SC) (Assembly constituency), a constituency of Telangana Legislative Assembly
 Alampur Kot, village in Ramnagar Mandal of Bareilly district in Uttar Pradesh, India
 Alampur, Gujarat, a town in Western India

Other 
 Alampur Baneshan (mango), a mango variety
 Dr. Alampur Saibaba Goud, an Indian ophthalmologist, founder-chairman of the Devnar Foundation for the Blind

See also 
 Dera Alampur Gondlan, a village in Tehsil Kharian, in the Gujrat District of Punjab, Pakistan